The following is a list of United States Major League Baseball teams that played in the National League during the 19th century. None of these teams, other than Athletic and Mutual, had actual names during this period; sportswriters however often applied creative monickers which are still, mistakenly, used today as "team names" following a convention established in 1951.

Surviving teams

Major league
Boston: "Red Stockings, "Red Caps," "Beaneaters"  1876–1900 – now Atlanta Braves
Brooklyn: "Grays," "Bridegrooms," "Grooms," "Superbas," "Robins," "Trolley Dodgers" 1890–1900 – transferred from the American Association; now Los Angeles Dodgers
Chicago "White Stockings": 1876–1900 – now known as the Cubs
Cincinnati: "Red Stockings" or "Reds" 1890–1900 – transferred from the American Association
New York: occasionally "Gothams," more often "Giants" 1883–1900 – later the New York Giants and now San Francisco Giants
Philadelphia 1883–1900 – very occasionally tagged "Quakers" 1883–1890, most often "Philadelphias" in the style of the day, shortened to "Phillies."
Pittsburgh: 1887–1900 founded as Allegheny (a Pittsburgh suburb) and referred to in typical manner as "Alleghenys" 1883-1890, dubbed "Pirates" from 1891 – transferred from the American Association
St. Louis "Brown Stockings or "Browns," later "Red Stockings" or "Reds" 1892–1900 – transferred from the American Association; now known as the Cardinals.

Minor league
Buffalo Bisons 1879–1885 – moved to the minors in 1886 and played in Buffalo until 1970 before several moves. Suspended operations in 1973. A current minor league team bearing the "Buffalo Bisons" name, dating to 1979, claims this team as part of their official history.

Defunct teams
Baltimore Orioles 1892-1899 - transferred from the American Association
Cincinnati Red Stockings 1876–1879
Cleveland Blues 1879–1884
Cincinnati Stars 1880
Cleveland Spiders 1889–1899 – transferred from the American Association; the 1899 Cleveland Spiders hold the record for the worst winning percentage in the history of Major League Baseball
Detroit Wolverines 1881–1888
Hartford Dark Blues 1876–1877 – transferred from National Association; based in Brooklyn in 1877
Indianapolis Blues 1878
St. Louis Maroons/Black Diamonds/Indianapolis Hoosiers 1885–1889 – transferred from the Union Association in 1885; moved to Indianapolis where often called Hoosiers in 1887
Kansas City Cowboys 1886
Louisville Grays 1876–1877
Louisville Colonels 1892–1899 – transferred from the American Association
Milwaukee Grays (or Cream Citys) 1878
Minneapolis Millers 1888
Mutual of New York 1876 – transferred from National Association
Athletic of Philadelphia 1876 – transferred from National Association
Providence Grays 1878–1885
St. Louis Brown Stockings 1876–1877 – transferred from National Association
Syracuse Stars 1879
Troy Trojans 1879–1882
Washington Nationals 1886–1889
Washington Senators (1891–99)
Worcester Ruby Legs 1880–1882

Timeline

Franchises by Year
1876
Boston
Chicago
Cincinnati
Hartford
Louisville
Mutual
Athletic
St. Louis
Between 1876 and 1877 seasons
Drop: Mutual and Athletic
1877
Boston
Chicago
Cincinnati
Hartford (played most games in Brooklyn)
Louisville
St. Louis
Between 1877 and 1878 seasons
Drop: Hartford, Louisville and St. Louis
Add: Indianapolis, Milwaukee and Providence
1878
Boston
Chicago
Cincinnati
Indianapolis
Milwaukee
Providence
Between 1878 and 1879 seasons
Drop: Indianapolis and Milwaukee
Add: Buffalo, Cleveland, Syracuse and Troy
1879
Boston
Chicago
Cincinnati
Providence
Buffalo
Cleveland
Syracuse
Troy
Between 1879 and 1880 seasons
Drop: Syracuse
Add: Worcester
1880
Boston
Chicago
Cincinnati
Providence
Buffalo
Cleveland
Troy
Worcester
Between 1880 and 1881 seasons
Drop: Cincinnati
Add: Detroit
1881
Boston
Chicago
Providence
Buffalo
Cleveland
Troy
Worcester
Detroit
Between 1881 and 1882 seasons
Drop:none
Add: none
1882
Boston
Chicago
Providence
Buffalo
Cleveland
Troy
Worcester
Detroit
Between 1882 and 1883 seasons
Drop: Troy and Worcester
Add: New York and Philadelphia
1883
Boston
Chicago
Providence
Buffalo
Cleveland
Detroit
New York
Philadelphia
Between 1883 and 1884 seasons
Drop: none
Add: none
1884
Boston
Chicago
Providence
Buffalo
Cleveland
Detroit
New York
Philadelphia
Between 1884 and 1885 seasons
Drop: Cleveland
Add: St. Louis from the Union Association
1885
Boston
Chicago
Providence
Buffalo
Detroit
New York
Philadelphia
St. Louis
Between 1885 and 1886 seasons
Drop: Buffalo and Providence
Add: Kansas City and Washington
1886
Boston
Chicago
Detroit
New York
Philadelphia
St. Louis
Kansas City
Washington
Between 1886 and 1887 seasons
Drop: Kansas City 
Add: Pittsburgh (from the American Association)
Move: St. Louis to Indianapolis
1887
Boston
Chicago
Detroit
New York
Philadelphia
Washington
Indianapolis
Pittsburgh
Between 1887 and 1888 seasons
Drop: none
Add: Minneapolis
1888
Boston
Chicago
Detroit
New York
Philadelphia
Washington
Indianapolis
Pittsburgh
Minneapolis
Between 1888 and 1889 seasons
Drop: Detroit
Add: Cleveland from the American Association
1889
Boston
Chicago
New York
Philadelphia
Washington
Indianapolis
Pittsburgh
Cleveland
Between 1889 and 1890 seasons
Drop: Indianapolis and Washington
Add: Brooklyn and Cincinnati (both from the American Association)
1890
Boston
Chicago
New York
Philadelphia
Pittsburgh
Cleveland
Brooklyn
Cincinnati
Between 1890 and 1891 seasons
Drop: none
Add: none
1891
Boston
Chicago
New York
Philadelphia
Pittsburgh
Cleveland
Brooklyn
Cincinnati
Between 1891 and 1892 seasons
Drop: none
Add: Baltimore, Louisville, St. Louis and Washington (all from the American Association)
1892–1899
Boston
Chicago
New York
Philadelphia
Pittsburgh
Cleveland
Brooklyn
Cincinnati
Baltimore
Louisville
St. Louis 
Washington

This lineup of teams remained the same from 1892 to the end of the 1899 season. After the 1899 season Baltimore, Cleveland, Louisville and Washington were dropped from the National League.

1900
Boston
Chicago
New York
Philadelphia
Pittsburgh
Brooklyn
Cincinnati
St. Louis

This lineup remained the same until Boston relocated to Milwaukee in 1953.

See also
List of National League pennant winners
History of baseball team nicknames

References 

Articles which contain graphical timelines